Magdalene of Brandenburg (died: 27 October 1454 in Scharnebeck) was a princess of Brandenburg by birth and by marriage Duchess of Brunswick-Lüneburg.

Life 
Magdalena was the daughter of Elector Frederick I of Brandenburg (1371–1440) from his marriage to Elizabeth (1383-1442 ), daughter of Duke Frederick "the Wise" of Bavaria-Landshut.  Magdalene's brothers were Electors of Brandenburg, one after the other, first Frederick II, then Albrecht III Achilles.

She married on 3 July 1429 in Tangermünde with Duke Frederick II of Brunswick-Lüneburg (1418–1478). The marriage had been arranged by Emperor Sigismund, like the marriage of her sister Cecilia with Duke William "the Victorious" of Brunswick-Wolfenbüttel. Both couples were engaged on 3 March 1420.  Magdalena brought a dowry of  into the marriage, for which Wichard von Rochow had vouched, and was promised Bodenteich Castle as her wittum, but later received the city and castle of Lüchow instead.

Issue 
From her marriage Magdalena had the following children:
 Bernard II (1432–1464), Duke of Brunswick-Lüneburg
 married in 1463 Countess Mathilde von Holstein-Schauenburg (d. 1468)
 Otto V, Duke of Brunswick-Lüneburg (1438/39-1471), Duke of Brunswick-Lüneburg
 married in 1467 Countess Anne of Nassau-Siegen (1440/41–1514)
 Margaret (1442–1512)
 married in 1452 Duke Henry of Mecklenburg-Stargard (d. 1466)

Footnotes 

Duchesses of Brunswick-Lüneburg
House of Hohenzollern
1412 births
1454 deaths
15th-century German people
15th-century German women
Middle House of Lüneburg
Daughters of monarchs